Holy Spirit Catholic High School is a private, Roman Catholic K-12 school in Tuscaloosa, Alabama.  It is located within the Roman Catholic Diocese of Birmingham in Alabama.

Background
The school was dedicated in 1963; predecessor schools date back to 1863.  The high school division was added in 1995 and the first class graduated in 1999.

Sexual Misconduct Allegations

2009 Criminal Investigation 
In November 2009, Tuscaloosa police arrested Holy Spirit's assistant football coach, Chip Ervin, for sexual misconduct with a 17-year-old student of the school and for the distribution of drugs to a minor. The investigation, led by Sgt. Michael Caisson of the juvenile division, focused on crimes that Ervin committed during the fall semester of 2008.

Ervin pleaded guilty to the charges.

Sr. Elaine Sebera, a member of the Sisters of Mercy and school principal at the time of the investigation, directed reporters' questions to diocesan officials who also declined to comment.

2018 Diocesan Review 
Bishop Robert Baker, about a year before his canonically required retirement, published a list of all priests the church deemed credibly accused of sexual misconduct in the Diocese of Birmingham.

Accused Priests 

 Charles Cross
 John "Jack Ventura
 Formerly served in the Diocese of Paterson, New Jersey. See priest shuffling and incardination.
 Charles Bordenca
 Kevin Cooke
 Roger Lott
 Jonathan "John" Franklin

The Holy Spirit website does not provide a list of former priests who have served the school. However, there are no known claims against priests of that parish.

Athletics 
Holy Spirit offers volleyball,football, cross country, basketball, softball, baseball, track, cheerleading, bowling, golf, and tennis.

Football Cancellation 
Holy Spirit suspended its varsity football program in 2019 citing low student interest and a lack of funding. According to AHSAA rules, the athletic program will not be allowed to have a varsity team until the 2022 school year.

Football Reinstatement 
As of 2022 Holy Spirit has reinstated their varsity football team.

References

External links
 School Website

High schools in Tuscaloosa, Alabama
Private K-12 schools in Alabama
Catholic elementary schools in the United States
Catholic secondary schools in Alabama
Educational institutions established in 1963
1963 establishments in Alabama